Vess Soda is a brand of soft drink manufactured and distributed primarily in the St. Louis, Missouri, United States metropolitan area and recently in Canada through Dollarama and Giant Tiger locations.  The company was founded in 1916 by Sylvester Jones, who arrived at the Vess brand name from his nickname. 

Whistle Orange Soda was introduced in 1925, with the Vess logo on other soda flavors. The 1929 stock market crash left the company in bad financial shape. The business was sold to Donald Schneeberger. Schneeberger was considered a genius at marketing and added several new flavors to the line, many of which are still produced today. At the height of its popularity, Vess had bottling plants in several locations, including Asheville, North Carolina; Lafayette, Indiana; Anderson, Indiana; and Cincinnati, Ohio. 

Vess was purchased in 1994 by Cott Beverages. In 2017, Refresco purchased Cott and assumed ownership of the Vess label. Vess continued to be distributed primarily in the Midwestern United States with its core business centering around St. Louis, where the Vess bottle statue near the Gateway Arch is a protected landmark. In 2021, Vess hired Folsom Distributing Company of St. Louis to distribute its products in the St. Louis region.

Current products
As of 2007, Vess is sold in small plastic bottles and cans, as well as 2- and 3-liter bottles. Its slogan is "The Billion Bubble Beverage."

Past products
In the 1980s, Vess produced a chocolate beverage similar to Yoo-hoo called Vess Chocolate. It was discontinued in the mid-1990s.

Vess also made Holy Cow collectible soda in a variety of flavors in 1988. It featured an illustration of Harry Caray's face on each can.

See also
 7 Up
 Coca-Cola
 Pepsi-Cola
 Shasta
 The Bottle District

References

External links
 Giant replica of a family-size Vess soda bottle neon Sign

Companies based in St. Louis
American soft drinks
Cuisine of St. Louis
Food and drink companies established in 1916
Drink companies of the United States
Food and drink companies based in Missouri